The VMI Keydets baseball team represents the Virginia Military Institute in Lexington, Virginia. The team is a member of the Southern Conference, which is part of the National Collegiate Athletic Association's Division I. VMI's first baseball team was fielded in 1866. The team plays its home games at Gray–Minor Stadium in Lexington, Virginia. The Keydets are coached by Sam Roberts.

History
In fall 1866, just two years after the Virginia Military Institute had been burned down by David Hunter and the Union Army, a group of cadets got together and created the Institute's first organized baseball team. It was the first organized team from any sport. In the inaugural season, the Keydets had an astounding mark of 20–1–2, playing among in-state rivals such as Washington and Lee, Virginia, Virginia Tech, Randolph-Macon and Hampden-Sydney, and continuously so for the next several decades.

In 1921, the team started playing at recently built Alumni Memorial Field along with the football team. Both squads had, up to that point, been playing on the Parade Ground. It was not until the 1960s that the baseball team shifted to Patchin Field, and most recently in 2007, began playing in Gray-Minor Stadium.

Despite having many winning seasons throughout the 20th century and into the last decade, the Keydets have never been able to make the NCAA tournament. The 1993 team came closest to breaking the barrier with a run to the Southern Conference finals, and despite being an 8th seed, VMI upended three higher-seeded teams before bowing down to eventual champion Western Carolina.

Year-by-year results

VMI and MLB
VMI has had 31 Major League Baseball Draft selections since the draft began in 1965.

In popular culture
The 1938 film, Brother Rat is set at the Virginia Military Institute. The film features Eddie Albert as the VMI baseball team's star pitcher, and Ronald Reagan as his catcher. The film's plot centers on Albert and Reagan as they attempt to win the big baseball game against rival Virginia. Portions of the film were shot on location at the VMI campus in Lexington. In 1940, the film was followed by a sequel, Brother Rat and a Baby, featuring the same lead cast members. The sequel film's plot centered on the since-graduated Albert's attempt to get a job as a baseball coach at his alma mater.

See also
List of NCAA Division I baseball programs

References

External links
 

 
Baseball teams established in 1866
1866 establishments in Virginia